The Career Commendation Medal is awarded by the Central Intelligence Agency for exemplary service significantly above normal duties that had an important contribution to the Agency's mission.

See also 
Awards and decorations of the United States government

References

Awards and decorations of the Central Intelligence Agency